David Charles Horowitz (June 30, 1937February 14, 2019) was an American consumer reporter and journalist for KNBC in Los Angeles, whose Emmy-winning TV program Fight Back! would warn viewers about defective products, test advertised claims to see if they were true, and confront corporations about customer complaints. He was on the boards of directors of the National Broadcast Editorial Conference, City of Hope, and the American Cancer Society, and he served on the advisory boards of the FCC and the Los Angeles District Attorney.

Horowitz has been described as a consumer advocate; he personally shunned the description, noting that he always tried to maintain an objective point of view toward both the consumer and the businesses he profiled.

Early life
David Horowitz attended Bradley University, where he became a member of Alpha Epsilon Pi, and graduated with high honors in 1959. Horowitz earned a master's degree in journalism from Northwestern University in 1961, then worked at newspapers and TV stations in the Midwest, including KRNT-TV (now KCCI) in Des Moines, Iowa.  He was a writer for The Huntley–Brinkley Report.

Television career 
Horowitz opened the first news bureau for NBC News during the Vietnam War.

In early 1973, Horowitz was offered a chance to develop a consumer-awareness news segment for KNBC, NBC's flagship Los Angeles station. He nearly turned it down because they had offered it to six other people before him. Nevertheless, the segment on KNBC Newservice was successful, and Horowitz gained a reputation through the 1970s as a consumer reporter and advocate. He began the weekly consumer advocate program Fight Back! with David Horowitz in 1976, and he made appearances on NBC programs including regular appearances on the Today program and on America Alive! in 1978.

Horowitz made a guest appearance on The Super Mario Bros. Super Show! in 1989.  He also appeared as himself on an episode of Silver Spoons, ALF, The Golden Girls, The Munsters Today, and Saved by the Bell. Horowitz was also a regular guest on The Tonight Show Starring Johnny Carson (which also occasionally parodied him as "David Howitzer").

Horowitz left KNBC in August 1992 after the station declined to renew his contract and joined KCBS-TV the following year where he resumed his Fight Back! segments for Channel 2 Action News.

Hostage situation
On August 19, 1987, during the 4 p.m. edition of KNBC's Channel 4 News, a gun-wielding man named Gary Stollman got into NBC's Burbank Studios as a guest of an employee, and took Horowitz hostage live on the air. With the gun pressed on his side, Horowitz calmly read the gunman's statements on camera but unbeknownst to the gunman, the news feed had been taken off the air. The unidentified man revealed at the end of his statement that the gun was an empty BB gun and set the gun down on the news desk, at which point anchorman John Beard quickly confiscated it. The incident led Horowitz to start a campaign to ban realistic toy guns.

Controversies
In 1998, Horowitz joined a political campaign to urge voters to defeat a California ballot initiative calling for a 20% cut in electricity rates for private utility customers and ending surcharges on ratepayers to pay for nuclear power plants.  Horowitz later admitted he was paid $106,000 by the campaign.

Death
Horowitz died on February 14, 2019, from complications due to dementia. He is survived by his wife, two daughters, and two grandchildren.  David Horowitz's daughter Amanda Horowitz owns and has continued work under the Fight Back! brand.

References

External links
 Fight Back website
 KNBC-TV Live On-Air Incident: August 19, 1987

1937 births
2019 deaths
American male journalists
Jewish American writers
Consumer rights activists
Television anchors from Los Angeles
Medill School of Journalism alumni
Writers from the Bronx
21st-century American Jews
City of Hope National Medical Center